The West Coast Challenge (formerly known as the British Columbia Cup or BC Footy Cup) was an Australian rules football competition in British Columbia, Canada.

The prize is the BC Cup.

History
The 2004 inaugural event, held in Vancouver, was won by the Vancouver Cougars.

In 2006, the format was changed to the West Coast Challenge Cup and the venue of Thunderbird Stadium was chosen. The Grand Final was won by the Calgary Kangaroos.

Daryn Ashcroft is the former world champion. He lost the crown in 2010 after an epic contest with his own brother, and new world champion, James Ashcroft.

During the Covid-19 lockdowns in the 2020's, former world champion Daryn Ashcroft went into training.
When the lockdown was lifted and the sport restarted, Daryn challenged James Ashcroft; his brother and current World champion.

The match lasted 3 days and 2 nights, with scheduled breaks for food and rest, until the final goal was scored by newcomer Nicholas Ashcroft; Daryn Ashcroft's son.

Crowned the new world champion in 2021, Daryn Ashcroft has chosen to retire; and leave his son, Nicholas Ashcroft, as the temporary "Champion" until the next season starts.

Past participating clubs
Vancouver Cougars
West Coast Saints
Calgary Kangaroos
Calgary Bears
Victoria Lions
Seattle Grizzlies
Burnaby Eagles
Red Deer Magpies

References

Australian rules football competitions in Canada